Tournaments include international (FIBA), professional (club) and amateur and collegiate levels.

Tournaments

Men's tournaments

Olympic qualifiers
2011 FIBA Africa Championship – Antananarivo, Madagascar
  
  
  
 4th 
2011 FIBA Americas Championship – Mar del Plata, Argentina.
  
  
  
 4th 
2011 FIBA Oceania Championship – Australia
  
  
EuroBasket 2011 – Lithuania
  
  
  
 4th 
2011 FIBA Asia Championship – Wuhan, China
  
  
  
 4th

Women's tournaments

Olympic qualifiers
2011 FIBA Africa Championship for Women – Bamako, Mali
  
  
  
 4th 
2011 FIBA Americas Championship for Women – Neiva, Colombia.
  
  
  
 4th 
2011 FIBA Asia Championship for Women – Ōmura, Nagasaki, Japan
  
  
  
 4th 
EuroBasket Women 2011 – Poland
  
  
  
 4th 
2011 FIBA Oceania Championship for Women – Australia

Youth tournaments
2011 FIBA Under-19 World Championship – Latvia
 
  
  
 4th 
2011 FIBA Under-19 World Championship for Women – Chile
 
  
  
 4th

Club championships

Continental championships
Men:
Euroleague:
  Panathinaikos   Maccabi Tel Aviv   Montepaschi Siena
Eurocup:
  UNICS Kazan   Cajasol   Cedevita Zagreb
EuroChallenge:
  Krka Novo Mesto   Lokomotiv–Kuban Krasnodar   Telenet Oostende
Asia Champions Cup:
  Al-Riyadi Beirut   Mahram Tehran   Al-Rayyan
Americas League:
  Regatas Corrientes   Capitanes de Arecibo   Halcones UV Xalapa
Women:
EuroLeague Women:
  Halcón Avenida Salamanca   Spartak Moscow Region   UMMC Ekaterinburg

Transnational championships
 NBA
Season:
 Division champions: Boston Celtics (Atlantic), Chicago Bulls (Central), Miami Heat (Southeast), Oklahoma City Thunder (Northwest), Los Angeles Lakers (Pacific), San Antonio Spurs (Southwest)
 Best regular-season record: Chicago Bulls (62–20)
 Eastern Conference: Miami Heat
 Western Conference: Dallas Mavericks
 Finals: The Mavericks win their first NBA title, defeating the Heat 4–2 in the best-of-7 series. The Mavs' Dirk Nowitzki is named Finals MVP.
  National Basketball League, 2010–11 season:
 Premiers: New Zealand Breakers
 Champions: The Breakers defeat the Cairns Taipans 2–1 in the best-of-three Grand Final, becoming the first New Zealand team to win an Australian national league title in any sport.
 Adriatic League, 2010–11 season:  Partizan Belgrade defeat  Union Olimpija Ljubljana 77–74 in the one-off final.
 ASEAN Basketball League, 2010–11 season:  Chang Thailand Slammers defeat  Philippine Patriots 2–0 in the best-of-three finals.
 Baltic League:  Žalgiris Kaunas defeat  VEF Riga 75–67 in the one-off final.
 VTB United League, 2010–11 season:  BC Khimki defeat  CSKA Moscow 66–64 in the one-off final.

National championships
Men:
 Liga Nacional de Básquet, 2010–11 season: Guangdong Southern Tigers
 Regular season: Obras Sanitarias
 Playoffs: Peñarol defeat Atenas 4–1 in the best-of-seven final.
 Basketball League Belgium: Spirou Charleroi sweep Okapi Aalstar 3–0 in the best-of-5 finals.
 Bosnia and Herzegovina Championship:
 Novo Basquete Brasil: UniCEUB/BRB Brasília defeat Franca 3–1 in the best-of-5 finals.
 Bulgarian National League: Lukoil Academic complete a 36–0 season in domestic play with a 3–0 sweep of Levski Sofia in the best-of-5 finals.
 Chinese Basketball Association: 2010–11 season: Guangdong Southern Tigers defeat Xinjiang Flying Tigers 4-2 in the best-of-seven finals.
 Croatian League: KK Zagreb sweep Cedevita Zagreb 3–0 in the best-of-5 finals.
 Czech League: ČEZ Nymburk defeat Prostějov 4–2 in the best-of-7 finals.
 Dutch Basketball League: ZZ Leiden defeat GasTerra Flames 4–3 in the best-of-7 finals.
 Estonian League, 2010–11: Kalev/Cramo sweep TÜ/Rock 4–0 in the best-of-7 final.
 French Pro A League: Nancy defeat Cholet 76–74 in the one-off final.
 German Bundesliga, 2010–11 season: Brose Baskets defeat ALBA Berlin 3–2 in the best-of-5 finals.
 Greek League, 2010–11 season: Panathinaikos defeat Olympiacos 3–1 in the best-of-5 finals. Before the finals, Olympiacos had gone 36–0 in domestic competition this season.
 Iranian Super League, 2010–11 season:
 Israeli Super League, 2010–11 season: Maccabi Tel Aviv defeat Hapoel Gilboa Galil 91–64 in the one-off final.
 Italian Serie A, 2010–11 season: Montepaschi Siena defeat Bennet Cantù 4–1 in the best-of-7 finals.
 Latvian League: VEF Riga defeat Ventspils 4–3 in the best-of-7 finals.
 Lithuanian LKL: Žalgiris defeat Lietuvos Rytas 4–1 in the best-of-7 finals.
 Montenegro League:
 Philippine Basketball Association, 2010–11 season:
Philippine Cup: The Talk 'N Text Tropang Texters defeat the San Miguel Beermen 4–2 in the best-of-7 finals.
Commissioner's Cup:  The Texters win their second trophy of the season, defeating the Barangay Ginebra Kings 4–2 in the best-of-7 finals.
Governors Cup: The Petron Blaze Boosters deny the Texters a Grand Slam, defeating them 4–3 in the best-of-7 finals.
 Polish League: Asseco Prokom Gdynia defeat Turów Zgorzelec 4–3 in the best-of-7 finals.
 Russian PBL: CSKA Moscow defeat Khimki 3–1 in the best-of-5 finals.
 League of Serbia, 2010–11 season: Partizan sweep Hemofarm 3–0 in the best-of-5 finals.
 Slovenian League:
 Spanish ACB:
Season: Regal FC Barcelona
Playoffs: Barça sweep Bizkaia Bilbao 3–0 in the best-of-5 finals.
 Turkish Basketball League: Fenerbahçe Ülker defeat Galatasaray Café Crown 4–2 in the best-of-7 finals.
 Ukrainian SuperLeague: Budivelnyk defeat Donetsk 4–3 in the best-of-7 finals.
 British Basketball League, 2010–11:
Season: Mersey Tigers
Playoffs: The Tigers defeat the Sheffield Sharks 79–74 in the one-off final.
 Super Basketball League:Taiwan Beer defeat Dacin Tigers 4-1 in the best-of-7 finals.

Women:
 WNBA
Season:
 Eastern Conference: Indiana Fever
 Western Conference: Minnesota Lynx
 Finals: The Lynx win their first WNBA title, sweeping the Fever 3–0 in the best-of-5 series. The Lynx' Seimone Augustus is named Finals MVP.

College
Men
 NCAA
Division I: Connecticut 53, Butler 41
Most Outstanding Player: Kemba Walker, Connecticut
National Invitation Tournament: Wichita State 66, Alabama 57
College Basketball Invitational: Oregon defeated Creighton 2–1 in the best-of-3 final.
CollegeInsider.com Tournament: Santa Clara 76, Iona 69
Division II: Bellarmine 71, BYU–Hawaii 68
Division III: St. Thomas (MN) 78, Wooster 54
 NAIA
NAIA Division I: Pikeville 83, Mountain State 76 (OT)
NAIA Division II: Cornerstone 80, Saint Francis (IN) 71
 NJCAA
Division I:
Division II: Lincoln College (Lincoln, Illinois)74, Mott Community College (Flint, Michigan) 67 
Division III:
 UAAP Men's: Ateneo defeated FEU 2–0 in the best-of-3 finals
 NCAA (Philippines) Seniors': San Beda defeated San Sebastian 2–0 in the best-of-3 finals

Women
 NCAA
Division I: Texas A&M 76, Notre Dame 70
Most Outstanding Player: Danielle Adams, Texas A&M
WNIT: Toledo 76, USC 68
Women's Basketball Invitational: UAB 68, Cal State Bakersfield 60
Division II: Clayton State 69, Michigan Tech 50
Division III: Amherst 64, Washington (MO) 55
 NAIA
NAIA Division I:
NAIA Division II:
 NJCAA
Division I:North Idaho College 90, Trinity Valley Community College 81
Division II:Monroe College 78, Lake Michigan College 73
Division III:Anoka-Ramsey Community College 60, Roxbury Community College 55
 UAAP Women's: FEU defeated Adamson Falcons 2-1 in the best-of-3 finals

Prep
 USA Today Boys Basketball Ranking #1: St. Anthony High School (New Jersey)
 USA Today Girls Basketball Ranking #1:
 NCAA (Philippines) Juniors: San Beda defeated LSGH 2-1 in the best-of-5 finals, with San Beda having a 1-0 advantage
 UAAP Juniors: NU defeated FEU-FERN 2–1 in the best-of-3 finals

Awards and honors

Naismith Memorial Basketball Hall of Fame
Class of 2011:
Players: Teresa Edwards, Artis Gilmore, Chris Mullin, Dennis Rodman, Arvydas Sabonis, Reece "Goose" Tatum
Coaches: Herb Magee, Tara VanDerveer, Tex Winter
Contributors: Tom "Satch" Sanders

Women's Basketball Hall of Fame
Class of 2011
 Val Ackerman
 Ruthie Bolton
 Vicky Bullett
 Muffet McGraw
 Pearl Moore
 Lometa Odom

Professional
Men
NBA Most Valuable Player Award: Derrick Rose, Chicago Bulls
NBA Rookie of the Year Award: Blake Griffin, Los Angeles Clippers
NBA Defensive Player of the Year Award: Dwight Howard, Orlando Magic
NBA Sixth Man of the Year Award: Lamar Odom, Los Angeles Lakers
NBA Most Improved Player Award: Kevin Love, Minnesota Timberwolves
NBA Sportsmanship Award: Stephen Curry, Golden State Warriors
NBA Coach of the Year Award: Tom Thibodeau, Chicago Bulls
J. Walter Kennedy Citizenship Award: Ron Artest, Los Angeles Lakers
NBA Executive of the Year Award: Gar Forman, Chicago Bulls and Pat Riley, Miami Heat
FIBA Europe Player of the Year Award: Dirk Nowitzki,  and Dallas Mavericks
Euroscar Award: Dirk Nowitzki,  and Dallas Mavericks
Mr. Europa:
Women
WNBA Most Valuable Player Award: Tamika Catchings, Indiana Fever
WNBA Defensive Player of the Year Award: Sylvia Fowles, Chicago Sky
WNBA Rookie of the Year Award: Maya Moore, Minnesota Lynx
WNBA Sixth Woman of the Year Award: DeWanna Bonner, Phoenix Mercury
WNBA Most Improved Player Award: Kia Vaughn, New York Liberty
Kim Perrot Sportsmanship Award: Sue Bird, Seattle Storm and Ruth Riley, San Antonio Silver Stars
WNBA Coach of the Year Award: Cheryl Reeve, Minnesota Lynx
WNBA All-Star Game MVP: Swin Cash, Seattle Storm
WNBA Finals Most Valuable Player Award: Seimone Augustus, Minnesota Lynx
FIBA Europe Player of the Year Award: Alba Torrens, Perfumerías Avenida, and Galatasaray Medical Park

Collegiate 
 Combined
Legends of Coaching Award: Tom Izzo, Michigan State
 Men
John R. Wooden Award: Jimmer Fredette, BYU
Naismith College Coach of the Year: Steve Fisher, San Diego State
Frances Pomeroy Naismith Award: Jacob Pullen, Kansas State
Associated Press College Basketball Player of the Year: Jimmer Fredette, BYU
NCAA basketball tournament Most Outstanding Player: Anthony Davis, Kentucky
USBWA National Freshman of the Year: Jared Sullinger, Ohio State
Associated Press College Basketball Coach of the Year: Mike Brey, Notre Dame
Naismith Outstanding Contribution to Basketball: Dick Enberg
 Women
John R. Wooden Award: Maya Moore, Connecticut
Naismith College Player of the Year: Maya Moore, Connecticut
Naismith College Coach of the Year: Tara VanDerveer, Stanford
Wade Trophy: Maya Moore, Connecticut
Frances Pomeroy Naismith Award: Courtney Vandersloot, Gonzaga
Associated Press Women's College Basketball Player of the Year: Maya Moore, Connecticut
NCAA basketball tournament Most Outstanding Player: Danielle Adams, Texas A&M
Basketball Academic All-America Team: Maya Moore, UConn
Kay Yow Award: Matt Bollant, Green Bay
Carol Eckman Award: Joanne Boyle, California
Maggie Dixon Award: Stephanie Glance, Illinois State
USBWA National Freshman of the Year: Odyssey Sims, Baylor
Associated Press College Basketball Coach of the Year: Geno Auriemma, Connecticut
Associated Press College Basketball Coach of the Year: Katie Meier, Miami (FL)
Associated Press College Basketball Coach of the Year: Tara VanDerveer, Stanford
List of Senior CLASS Award women's basketball winners: Maya Moore, Connecticut
Nancy Lieberman Award: Courtney Vandersloot, Gonzaga
Naismith Outstanding Contribution to Basketball: Cheryl Miller

Events
 On June 1, Shaquille O'Neal announced his retirement from basketball after 19 seasons and four world championships.  O'Neal made the announcement on his Twitter page.
 On July 1, the collective bargaining agreement between the NBA and its players union expires, and the league immediately imposes a lockout of its players.
 On July 20, Yao Ming officially announced his retirement from basketball after nine seasons and a series of foot and ankle injuries. Yao has been credited with fueling greatly increased interest in the NBA in his home country of China since his selection as the #1 overall pick in the 2002 NBA draft.
 On September 26, New Jersey Nets minority owner Jay-Z announced that the team would change its name to the Brooklyn Nets when it moves to its new arena for the 2012–13 season.

Movies
The Fab Five – an ESPN Films documentary about the 1990s Michigan Wolverines players known collectively as the Fab Five: Chris Webber, Jalen Rose, Juwan Howard, Jimmy King, and Ray Jackson
Off the Rez – a TLC documentary chronicling the high school career of current University of Louisville women's player Shoni Schimmel, a Native American who grew up on an Oregon reservation
Runnin' Rebels of UNLV – a Home Box Office documentary chronicling the UNLV men's team's success in the late 1980s through early 1990s
Salaam Dunk
Unguarded – an ESPN Films documentary about former NBA player Chris Herren, including his struggle with and ongoing recovery from drug addiction

Deaths
 January 12 — Howard Engleman, All-American player and interim head coach for the Kansas Jayhawks men's basketball team (born 1919)
 January 16 — Guðmundur Þorsteinsson, Icelandic national team player and coach (born 1942)
 February 2 — Roger Strickland, NBA player (Baltimore Bullets) (born 1940)
 February 4 — Lee Winfield, NBA player (Seattle SuperSonics, Buffalo Braves, Kansas City Kings) (born 1947)
 February 6 — Cesare Rubini, Italian coach and member of the Naismith Memorial Basketball Hall of Fame (born 1923)
 February 20 — Troy Jackson, better known by his nickname "Escalade", streetball player for the AND1 Mixtape Tour (born 1976)
 March 4 — Ed Manning, NBA and ABA player and father of 1988 #1 overall NBA Draft pick Danny Manning (born 1943)
 March 7 — Rudy Salud, former commissioner of the Philippine Basketball Association (born 1938)
 March 22 — Edgar Lacey, ABA player (Los Angeles Stars) and national champion at UCLA (born 1944)
 April 2 — Larry Finch, college coach and player (Memphis) (born 1951)
 April 10 — Bob Shaw, American NBL player (born 1921)
 April 14 — Joe Dan Gold, college player and coach (Mississippi State) (born 1942)
 April 15 — Beryl Shipley, college coach (Southwestern Louisiana) (born 1926)
 May 11 — Robert Traylor, NBL and NBA player (Milwaukee Bucks, Cleveland Cavaliers, Charlotte Hornets) (born 1977)
 May 27 — Margo Dydek, Polish WNBA player (Utah Starzz, San Antonio Silver Stars, Connecticut Sun, Los Angeles Sparks) (born 1974)
 June 6 — Bill Closs, NBA player (Philadelphia Warriors, Fort Wayne Pistons) (born 1922)
 June 9 — Mike Mitchell, NBA player (Cleveland Cavaliers, San Antonio Spurs) (born 1956)
 June 15 — Marshall Rogers, NBA player (Golden State Warriors) and the 1976 NCAA Division I season scoring leader (born 1953)
 June 27 — Lorenzo Charles, NBA player (Atlanta Hawks) famous for hitting the game-winning shot of the 1983 NCAA tournament for NC State (born 1963)
 July 1 — Bob McCann, NBA player (five teams) (born 1964)
 July 5 — Neil Dougherty, college coach (TCU) (born 1961)
 July 5 — Armen Gilliam, NBA player (six teams) (born 1964)
 July 9 — Don Ackerman, NBA player (New York Knicks) (born 1930)
 July 16 — Joe McNamee, NBA player (Rochester Royals, Baltimore Bullets) (born 1926)
 July 30 — Bob Peterson, NBA player (Baltimore Bullets, Milwaukee Hawks, New York Knicks) (born 1932)
 August 3 — Ray Patterson, NBA executive (Milwaukee Bucks, Houston Rockets)
 August 4 — Sherman White, college player at Long Island famous for being indicted in point shaving scandal (born 1928)
 August 8 — Mike Barrett, ABA player and Olympic gold medalist in 1968 (born 1943)
 August 18 — Scotty Robertson, NBA and college coach (born 1930)
 August 27 — Bob Hubbard, American NBL and BAA player (born 1922)
 August 31 — Cal Christensen, NBA player (Milwaukee Hawks, Cincinnati Royals) (born 1927)
 August 31 — Jack Stephens, NBA player (St. Louis Hawks) (born 1933)
 September 14 — Lewis Brown, NBA player (Washington Bullets) (born 1955)
 September 16 — Dave Gavitt, American basketball coach (Providence College) and founder of the Big East Conference; member of the Naismith Hall as a contributor (born 1937)
 September 17 — Fedon Matheou, Greek basketball player and coach (born 1924)
 September 21 — Mickey Rottner, American NBL (Sheboygan Red Skins) and BAA (Chicago Stags) player (born 1919)
 September 22 — John H. Dick, starter on first NCAA championship team (1939 Oregon Ducks) (born 1918)
 September 30 — Peter Gent, standout forward/center for Michigan State from 1962–64 and author of North Dallas Forty (born 1942)
 October 3 — Jim Neal, NBA player (Syracuse Nationals) (born 1930)
 October 9 — Antonis Christeas, Greek basketball player (Panellinios, AEK Athens)  (born 1937)
 October 9 — Chauncey Hardy, 23-year-old American playing professionally in Romania (born 1988)
 October 12 — Lewis Mills, college coach (Richmond) and athletic director
 November 2 — Ilmar Kullam, Olympic silver medalist for the Soviet Union in 1952 (born 1922)
 November 8 — Ed Macauley, Hall of Fame player (St. Louis Hawks) (born 1928)
 November 9 — Bob Carney, NBA player (Minneapolis Lakers) (born 1932)
 November 17 — Kurt Budke, women's college basketball coach (Oklahoma State) (born 1961)
 November 18 — Walt Hazzard, NBA player and college coach (UCLA) (born 1942)
 November 22 — Alberto Reynoso, Philippine Basketball Association player (born 1940)
 November 25 — Hoddy Mahon, College basketball coach (Seton Hall)
 November 30 — George McCarty, College coach (New Mexico State, UTEP) (born 1915)
 December 1 — Dick Wehr, BAA player (Indianapolis Jets) and college coach (Georgia State) (born 1925)

See also
 Timeline of women's basketball

References

External links